× Bratonia, abbreviated  Brat. in the horticultural trade, is the nothogenus for intergeneric hybrids between the orchid genera Brassia and Miltonia (Brs. × Milt.).  An incorrect synonym for this nothogenus is × Miltassia (Mtssa.).

References

Orchid nothogenera
Oncidiinae